Olive is  a feminine given name of English origin meaning olive tree.  The name is associated with peace because of the symbolism of the olive branch. An olive wreath has traditionally been worn by champions as a symbol of victory. It has also been seen as a symbol of fruitfulness.

Popularity 
Olive came into fashion in English-speaking countries in the 1800s along with other tree, plant and flower names for girls and was a more popular name during that era than the related Olivia, which has been among the most popular names for girls in recent years. Olive was among the top hundred names for girls in the United States in the late 1800s and early 1900s and remained among the top one thousand names through 1950. The name declined in popularity in the latter half of the twentieth century. 

Its increase in usage in the early twenty-first century has coincided with the popularity of Olivia. It also increased in popularity after the release of the 2006 film Little Miss Sunshine and the 2010 film Easy A, both of which featured a lead character named Olive. In the film Easy A, Olive is said to be an anagram of the words “I love.”   Author Laura Wattenberg notes that the name is “aggressively contrarian” and atypical of the style of names that have been popular in recent years but its counterculture style might explain its increase in usage.

Olive has again been among the top one thousand names for newborn American girls since 2007, among the top three hundred names for girls since 2012 and among the top two hundred most popular names for American girls since 2020.

Olive has been similarly popular in England and Wales, where it has been among the top five hundred names for girls since 2008 and was among the hundred most popular names for girls in 2020.

People

With the given name Olive 

Olive (martyr) (Blessed Olive), a Catholic martyr from Italy
Olive Ayhens (born 1943)
Olive Beamish (1890–1978), Irish born suffragette, used pseudonym 'Phyllis Brady' when arrested and force-fed
Olive Checkland (1920–2004), English historian and writer
Olive Cook (1912–2002), British writer and artist
Olive E. Dana (1859-1904), American author 
Olive Dehn (1914–2007), English children's writer and poet
DJ Olive, disk jockey and turntablist
Olive Dutton Green (1878–1930), Australian artist
Olive Edmundson, British horticulturalist
Olive Hirst (1912–1994), English advertising agent
Olive Sagapolu (born 1997), American football player
Olive Sanxay (1873-1965), American poet
Olive Smith (masseuse) (1880-1916), British masseuse physical training instructor, Scottish Women's Hospitals for Foreign Service in World War I
Olive Thomas (1894-1920), American silent-film actress, art model, and photo model.
Olive Zorian (1916–1965), English violinist

With the surname Olive 

 Olive, Lady Baillie (1899–1974), Anglo-American heiress, landowner and hostess
 Fernand Olive (1891-1949), French general
 Jean-Baptiste Olive (1848–1936), French painter
 Milton L. Olive, III (1946–1965), United States Army soldier during the Vietnam War
Rich Olive (1949–2016), American politician

Arts, entertainment, and media

Fictional characters
Olive, heroine of Olive, the Other Reindeer, an animated Christmas special
Olive, The Bash St. Kids' school cook
Olive Doyle, a main character from the show A.N.T. Farm
Olive, a main character from the show Elinor Wonders Why
Olive Kitteridge, the title character of a novel by Elizabeth Strout
Agent Olive, a character from the show Odd Squad in Season 1
Olive Hoover, a main character in the film Little Miss Sunshine
Olive Hornby, a minor character important to the backstory of Harry Potter character Moaning Myrtle
Olive Oyl, Popeye's girlfriend
Olive Penderghast, the protagonist of the 2010 film Easy A
Olive Rozalski, a main character from the 2019 TV show Sydney to the Max
Olive Rudge, a character from the 1969 TV show On The Buses
Olive Snook, a character from the 2007 TV show Pushing Daisies
Olive Stone, a character from the 2018 TV show Manifest
Olive, a main character from the 2011 TV show Justin Time

Notes 

English feminine given names
Given names derived from plants or flowers